Mauro Gianetti (born 16 March 1964 in Lugano) is a Swiss former professional road cyclist and later directeur sportif. Gianetti was employed as team manager for the  cycling team throughout its existence between 2004 and 2011.

Several riders have been sanctioned for doping violations that occurred during his tenure as directeur sportif, including Riccardo Riccò and Juan José Cobo. Gianetti currently sits on the Board of Directors of UAE Team Emirates.

With over 30 professional victories, Gianetti's biggest career accomplishments as a rider include winning the 1995 Liège–Bastogne–Liège and Amstel Gold Race and representing Switzerland at the 2000 Summer Olympics.

His son Noé Gianetti was also a professional cyclist.

Major results

1981
 3rd Road race, National Road Championships
1982
 1st  Road race, National Junior Road Championships
1983
 2nd Gran Premio di Chiasso
1984
 1st Stage 5b Settimana Ciclistica Bergamasca
1985
 2nd Circuito Belvedere
1986
 1st GP Lugano
 5th Tour du Nord-Ouest
1987
 7th Giro dell'Emilia
 9th Coppa Placci
 10th Giro di Toscana
1988
 5th Road race, UCI Road World Championships
 7th Overall Tour de Suisse
 9th Züri-Metzgete
 10th Giro dell'Emilia
 10th Coppa Sabatini
1989
 1st Tour du Nord-Ouest
 2nd Overall Kellogg's Tour of Britain
1st Stage 4
 2nd Kuurne–Brussels–Kuurne
 3rd Giro dell'Emilia
 5th Amstel Gold Race
 5th Trofeo Pantalica
 7th Paris–Camembert
1990
 1st Milano–Torino
 1st Coppa Placci
 3rd Grand Prix de Fourmies
 5th Overall Settimana Internazionale Coppi e Bartali
 8th Giro dell'Emilia
 10th Rund um den Henninger Turm
1991
 4th GP des Amériques
 5th Milano–Torino
 7th Coppa Sabatini
 7th Giro dell'Emilia
1992
 3rd Grand Prix de Fourmies
 5th Grand Prix d'Isbergues
 7th Trofeo Laigueglia
1993
 2nd Trofeo Melinda
 6th Giro del Veneto
1994
 1st Chur–Arosa
 2nd Milano–Torino
 9th Overall Tour de Suisse
 9th Giro di Lombardia
 9th Giro dell'Emilia
 9th Coppa Sabatini
1995
 1st Liège–Bastogne–Liège
 1st Amstel Gold Race
 2nd Overall Escalada a Montjuïc
1st Stage 1b (ITT)
 2nd Klasika Primavera
 3rd Overall UCI Road World Cup
 3rd Japan Cup
 3rd Subida a Txitxarro
 4th Road race, UCI Road World Championships
 5th Milano–Torino
 7th Overall Tour of the Basque Country
1996
 1st Japan Cup
 1st Klasika Primavera
 1st Chur–Arosa
 2nd  Road race, UCI Road World Championships
 2nd Overall Escalada a Montjuïc
1st Stage 1a
 3rd Overall Critérium International
1st Stage 2
 3rd Liège–Bastogne–Liège
 3rd Giro del Piemonte
 3rd Giro del Veneto
 4th Overall Tour of the Basque Country
 4th La Flèche Wallonne
 5th Overall Tour de Romandie
 6th Overall UCI Road World Cup
 6th Subida a Urkiola
 8th Giro di Lombardia
1997
 1st Paris–Camembert
 1st Polymultipliée de l'Hautil
 2nd Trophée des Grimpeurs
 3rd Japan Cup
 3rd Rund um den Henninger Turm
 5th Amstel Gold Race
 6th Overall Critérium International
 7th Grand Prix de Fourmies
 10th Liège–Bastogne–Liège
1998
 7th Liège–Bastogne–Liège
1999
 1st Trofeo Melinda
 1st Wartenberg Rundfahrt
 3rd Road race, National Road Championships
 6th Giro del Friuli
 7th Overall Settimana Internazionale Coppi e Bartali
2001
 1st  Overall Tour of Japan
1st Stage 3
 5th Road race, National Road Championships
 5th Sparkassen Giro Bochum
 6th Liège–Bastogne–Liège
 9th La Flèche Wallonne
2002
 2nd Tour de Berne
 4th Road race, National Road Championships
 6th Luk-Cup Bühl
 6th Grand Prix de Wallonie

After retirement 
Gianetti became assistant director of Dante Lam, and helped to film the Milan leg of Taiwanese movie To The Fore.

References

External links

1964 births
Living people
Swiss male cyclists
Olympic cyclists of Switzerland
Cyclists at the 2000 Summer Olympics
Sportspeople from Lugano
Swiss people of Italian descent